is the 10th major single by the Japanese girl idol group S/mileage. It was released in Japan on May 2, 2012 on the label Hachama.

The physical CD single debuted at number 6 in the Oricon weekly singles chart.

B-sides 
The B-side of the regular edition is a cover of the 2001 song "Koibito wa Kokoro no Ōendan" by the group Country Musume that released it as a single in 2001.

Release 
The single was released in five versions: four limited editions (Limited Editions A, B, C, and  D) and a regular edition.

All the limited editions came with a sealed-in serial-numbered entry card for the lottery to win a ticket to one of the single's launch events.

Personnel 
S/mileage members: 
 Ayaka Wada
 Kanon Fukuda
 Kana Nakanishi
 Akari Takeuchi
 Rina Katsuta
 Meimi Tamura

Track listing

Regular Edition

Limited Editions A, B, C, D

Charts

References

External links 
 Profile of the CD single on the official website of Hello! Project
 Profile of the CD single on the official website of Up-Front Works

2012 singles
Japanese-language songs
Angerme songs
Songs written by Tsunku
Song recordings produced by Tsunku
2012 songs